Chestnut Hill may refer to:

Buildings
 Chestnut Hill (Windsor Township, York County, Pennsylvania), a house on the National Register of Historic Places, U.S.
 Chestnut Hill (Orange, Virginia), a house on the National Register of Historic Places, U.S.
 The Chestnut Hill, a historic apartment building in Chestnut Hill, Massachusetts, U.S.

Education
 Chestnut Hill Academy, a college preparatory school in Philadelphia, Pennsylvania, U.S.
 Chestnut Hill College, in Philadelphia, Pennsylvania, U.S.

Places

United Kingdom
 Chestnut Hill, Cumbria, a suburb of Keswick

United States
 Chestnut Hill, Massachusetts, an unincorporated community six miles west of downtown Boston
 Chestnut Hill Cove, Maryland, an unincorporated community in Anne Arundel County
 Chestnut Hill, North Carolina (disambiguation), multiple locations in North Carolina
 Chestnut Hill, Northampton County, Pennsylvania, a census-designated place
 Chestnut Hill, Philadelphia, Pennsylvania, a neighborhood in Philadelphia
 Chestnuthill Township, Monroe County, Pennsylvania, a township in Monroe County
 Chestnut Hill, Tennessee, a small unincorporated community in Jefferson County
 Chestnut Hill, Virginia (disambiguation), multiple locations in Virginia
 Chestnut Hill, West Virginia, an unincorporated community in Hancock County

Railway stations
 Chestnut Hill Avenue (MBTA station), a stop on the MBTA Green Line B branch, in Boston, Massachusetts, U.S.
 Chestnut Hill Branch (disambiguation)
 Chestnut Hill station (disambiguation)

Other uses
 Chestnut Hill (Northampton County, Pennsylvania), a low mountain in Forks Township, U.S.
 Chestnut Hill (novel series), by Lauren Brooke

See also
 Chestnut Hill Historic District (disambiguation)
 Chestnut Hill Reservation, is a public recreation area and historic preserve surrounding the Chestnut Hill Reservoir in Boston, Massachusetts
 Chestnut Hill Reservoir, a reservoir in Boston, Massachusetts